漫画, 漫畫, or 漫畵 are "comics" in East Asian languages.
Manhua: Chinese comics.
Manga: Japanese comics.
Manhwa: Korean comics.